Rukavac may refer to:

 Rukavac, Primorje-Gorski Kotar County, a village near Matulji, Croatia
 Rukavac, Split-Dalmatia County, a village on Vis, Croatia